Yoda Ela (Giant Canal) or Jaya Ganga, an  long single banking water canal carrying excess water to Tissa Wewa reservoir from Kala Wewa reservoir in Anuradhapura. The Yodha Ela is known for achieving a rather low gradient for its time. The gradient is about 10 centimetres per kilometre or 6 inches per mile.

Construction
Yodha Ela was constructed during King Dathusena's reign in 459 AD. It is a trans-basin diversion canal transferring water from Kala Oya Basin to Malwathu Oya Basin. It has a gradient of the order of  drop along . Even with modern day survey equipment it would be difficult to achieve such accuracy.

Yodha Ela not only feeds Tissa Wewa, but also the nearby Abhaya Wewa and  Nuwara Wewa. A separate branch of the canal has then already brought water to the Nachchaduwa wewa.

King Parakramabahu who reigned the country from 1153 to 1186, expanded the area that contributed to the water in the canal by connecting more reservoirs to the network between Kala Wawa and Thissa Wawa. He then renamed it Jaya Ganga (River of Victory).

Functions
Yodha Ela functions in a way of a moving reservoir because of its single banking aspect which is different from the present day double banking irrigation canals'. It feeds water in an area of  feeding  of paddy lands and 120 small tanks on its way from Kala Wewa to Tissa Wewa

See also
 Abhayavapi
 Dhatusena of Anuradhapura
 Kala Wewa
 Nachchaduwa wewa
 Parakramabahu I
 Tissa Wewa (Anuradhapura)
 Tank cascade system

References

Bodies of water of Anuradhapura District
Canals in Sri Lanka